The Unusual Suspects is the second novel in The Sisters Grimm series written by Michael Buckley and illustrated by Peter Ferguson.

Characters
 Sabrina Grimm
 Daphne Grimm
 Granny Relda Grimm
 Mr. Canis (The Big Bad Wolf)
 Puck
 Mayor Charming (Prince Charming)
 Snow White
 The Pied Piper
 Wendell
 Mirror
 Rumpelstiltskin

Plot

2005 American novels
2005 children's books
American children's novels
American fantasy novels
American mystery novels
Children's fantasy novels
Children's mystery novels